Taka Boom (born Yvonne Stevens; October 8, 1954 in Chicago, Illinois) is an American R&B and dance music singer, and is the younger sister of singer Chaka Khan and Mark Stevens of Aurra. She sang background vocals for several Parliament albums in the 1970s. Taka Boom is sometimes credited as Takka Boom and is known for her work with DJ/producer Dave Lee, especially in a range of hits under the Joey Negro name. Boom was also a later member of the Norman Whitfield group The Undisputed Truth, and led them on their 1976 disco hit "You + Me = Love".

Discography

Albums

Singles

See also
List of Billboard number-one dance club songs
List of artists who reached number one on the U.S. Dance Club Songs chart
List of UK top-ten singles in 2000

References

1954 births
Living people
Singers from Chicago
American women singers
American dance musicians
P-Funk members